Kothur is a census town in Rangareddy district in the state of Telangana in India.

It is not to be confused with Kothur village in the Jayashankar Bhupalpally district of Telangana, some 60 km east of Warangal.  The newly rediscovered 6th-century Devunigutta Temple is some 4 km away from that Kothur.

Geography

See also 
 Mahabubnagar
 Shadnagar
 Kummariguda

References

Census towns in Telangana